Yu Keli (born 2005), is a Chinese footballer.

Club career
Yu enrolled in the Evergrande Football School in 2012, and went on to win multiple accolades and competitions with the academy. In October 2021, he moved to Spain to play for Moratalaz, making his debut on 3 October. A month later, he scored his first goal for the under-19s, a long-range effort in a 1–0 away win. He went on to score three more goals for Moratalaz.

Despite this good start to his career in Spain, he left Moratalaz in August 2022, returning to China.

References

2005 births
Living people
Chinese footballers
Guangzhou F.C. players
ED Moratalaz players
Chinese expatriate footballers
Chinese expatriate sportspeople in Spain
Expatriate footballers in Spain